Yuxarı Tüləkəran (also, Yukhary Tyulekiran and Yukhary Tyulyakeran) is a village and municipality in the Quba Rayon of Azerbaijan.  It has a population of 421.

References 

Populated places in Quba District (Azerbaijan)